There are a number of post-secondary educational institutions in Romania. Public universities, owned and operated by the state, emerged as such in the 1860s. Private universities, except for a handful of theological seminaries, were set up after the Romanian Revolution of 1989.

Public institutions of higher education

Private institutions of higher education

Accredited

Temporarily authorised to function

Temporarily authorised to function and undergoing accreditation

Former universities

See also
 Lists of universities and colleges by country
 Education in Romania

References
 Instituții de învățământ superior (Higher educational institutions), Romanian Ministry of National Education
 Quality assurance in Romanian higher education at aracis.ro

Education in Romania
Universities

Romania
Romania